Sparasion is a genus of wasps belonging to the family Sparasionidae, whitin the superfamily Platygastridae. The genus has specimens widespread in Eurasia, Africa, and temperate North America.

Species

The genus includes 141 species.

Some species:

Sparasion aenescens 
Sparasion aeneum 
Sparasion albopilosellum

References

Platygastridae
Hymenoptera genera